The préfou is a regional culinary specialty from Vendée, in France. The préfou is made with bread garnished with chopped fresh garlic and butter. It is generally served warm, as an appetizer. 

French cuisine
Appetizers